Regulator of G protein signaling 4 also known as RGP4 is a protein that in humans is encoded by the RGS4 gene. RGP4 regulates G protein signaling.

Function 

Regulator of G protein signalling (RGS) family members are regulatory molecules that act as GTPase activating proteins (GAPs) for G alpha subunits of heterotrimeric G proteins. RGS proteins are able to deactivate G protein subunits of the Gi alpha, Go alpha and Gq alpha subtypes. They drive G proteins into their inactive GDP-bound forms. Regulator of G protein signaling 4 belongs to this family. All RGS proteins share a conserved 120-amino acid sequence termed the RGS domain which conveys GAP activity. Regulator of G protein signaling 4 protein is 37% identical to RGS1 and 97% identical to rat Rgs4. This protein negatively regulates signaling upstream or at the level of the heterotrimeric G protein and is localized in the cytoplasm.

Clinical significance 

A number of studies associate the RGS4 gene with schizophrenia, while some fail to detect an association.

RGS4 is also of interest as one of the three main RGS proteins (along with RGS9 and RGS17) involved in terminating signalling by the mu opioid receptor, and may be important in the development of tolerance to opioid drugs.

Inhibitors
 cyclic peptides
 CCG-4986

Interactions
RGS4 has been shown to interact with:
 COPB2,
 ERBB3,  and
 GNAQ.

References

Further reading

 
 

 
  

Proteins